Siderophyllite is a rare member of the mica group of silicate minerals with formula KFe2+2Al(Al2Si2)O10(F,OH)2.

The mineral occurs in nepheline syenite pegmatites and granite and aplite greisens. It is associated with microcline and astrophyllite at Pikes Peak, Colorado. It is also found in the alkali pegmatites of Mont Saint-Hilaire, Quebec.

It was first described in 1880 for an occurrence near Pikes Peak, Colorado. The name derives from the Greek sideros, iron, and phyllon, leaf, in reference to its iron rich composition and perfect basal cleavage.

References

Phyllosilicates
Monoclinic minerals
Minerals in space group 12